OpenUK is a UK-based not-for-profit company which supports open source collaboration and open technologies within the United Kingdom. Its primary stated focus is to develop and sustain UK leadership in "open technology", consisting of open-source software, open-source hardware and open data. Participants in OpenUK are organisational supporters as well as individual volunteers and committee members, which constitute a body of expertise. In 2020, OpenUK was identified as a key strategic player in UK open source within the European Commission Open Source Software Country Intelligence Report for the United Kingdom, alongside the British Computer Society. The Chief Executive Officer and Chief Policy Officer for OpenUK is Amanda Brock.

Organisation

OpenUK is run by a leadership team covering core organizational functions, with thematic activities across its pillars being driven by workstream committees. Broken down by pillar, these include:

 Community: Events, Museums and Awards committees
 Legal & Policy: Ambassadors, Cloud and 5G
 Learning: Kids Competition and Universities

The organization operates a supporter system, where individuals can sign up to a monthly membership, conferring board election rights and additional benefits. OpenUK also works with partner organizations, on individual activities or generally, through donation and sponsorship models. The not-for-profit company is governed by an elected board of directors, who are held accountable to the company as guarantors. OpenUK is registered in England and Wales as a not-for-profit company, limited by guarantee.

Activities

OpenUK's activity is structured across three themes or pillars; Community, Legal & Policy and Learning.

Within the Community pillar, OpenUK runs a number of events and activities to create a voice inclusive of open technology communities across the UK. In 2020, these included the OpenUK Awards recognising achievement within the UK and contribution to UK leadership in open technologies. OpenUK also undertakes external advocacy, and ran an information stand at the European free software conference, FOSDEM, in 2020.

Under its Legal & Policy umbrella, OpenUK's activities aim to ensure an environment suitable for the use and deployment of open technology in the UK. This includes raising awareness of legal and policy developments within open technology, and collaborating on the EU OSOR report on UK open source activity.

Within the Learning pillar is promotion of open technology understanding and familiarity amongst young people and adults in the UK, including at school level and university level.

The UK government's Central Digital and Data Office identify OpenUK as the organisation to assist with locating resources to support the OpenDocument format.

Reports

A three-part report titled 'State of Open'  was commissioned and delivered in 2021. The Register commented: "OpenUK's latest report paints a rosy picture of open source adoption". The third part, based on a survey of 273 UK businesses, found the UK was the top contributor to open-source software in Europe.

OpenUK awards

A set of awards is run by OpenUK to recognise contributions to the UK open technology environment, divided across a number of categories:

 Young Person
 Individual
 Open Data: for a company, organisation or project
 Open Hardware: for a company, organisation or project
 Open Source Software: for a company, organisation or project
 Open Source Software in Finance and Fintech: for a company or project

Nominations are made early in the year, from which shortlists of 2-3 nominees are created by the Judging Panel. The first awards ceremony was held online in October 2020. The second ceremony, in November 2021, took place in Glasgow following OpenUK's Open Technology for Sustainability Day at COP26 and included two new categories: Belonging and Sustainability.

Winners

2020

 Young Person: Josh Lowe
 Individual: Liz Rice
 Open Data: National Library of Wales
 Open Hardware: lowRISC
 Open Source Software: HospitalRun
 Financial Services and Fintech in Open Source: Parity

2021

 Young Person: Samuel Von Stroud
 Individual: Kevin Mayfield
 Open Data: Open Knowledge Foundation
 Open Hardware: DevTank, HILTOP
 Open Source Software: The Herald Proximity Project
 Financial Services and Fintech in Open Source: Wise (company)
 Belonging: Endless Compute
 Sustainability: Icebreaker One

Kids Competition

In 2020, the Learning pillar included a Kids' Competition, producing online lessons and distributing interactive kits for teams to show creative use of open technology. Kits consisted of a Micro Bit embedded system and MiniMU glove kits split across teams. Materials were produced including animations and explanations of open source concepts by a number of educationalists and technologists, including Imogen Heap. School and community teams organized at a regional level for heats, through a video submission competition for a range of prizes.

COP26

Open Technology for Sustainability Day

As part of their Sustainability Strategy and Environmental Policy, OpenUK hosted their Open Technology for Sustainability Day at COP26 in Glasgow. The day included panel discussions and a keynote speech by Lord Francis Maude.

References

Private companies limited by guarantee of the United Kingdom